Pierrepont is a commune in the Meurthe-et-Moselle department in north-eastern France.

History 
During the First World War was from 1915 to 1918 in Ugny was the artillery, in the forest of Doncourt the training ground and in Beuveille has been the headquarter of the Sturm-Bataillon Nr. 5 (Rohr), in Pierrepont has been the hospital and the cemetery.

On the German soldiers cemetery, the dead of the Battalion were mostly buried. The monument, in the shape of a lion guarding the dead, has already been set up during the war and then not eliminated.

See also 
 Communes of the Meurthe-et-Moselle department

Notes 

Communes of Meurthe-et-Moselle